Daniel Ionuț Barna, (born 22 September 1986) is a Romanian football player who plays for Oberweikertshofen.

References

External links
 

1986 births
Living people
Sportspeople from Piatra Neamț
Romanian footballers
Association football defenders
Romania under-21 international footballers
CSM Ceahlăul Piatra Neamț players
FC Rapid Ghidighici players
FCV Farul Constanța players
FC Brașov (1936) players
FC Voluntari players
FC Dunărea Călărași players
Liga I players
Liga II players
FC Pipinsried players
Romanian expatriate footballers
Romanian expatriate sportspeople in Moldova
Expatriate footballers in Moldova
Romanian expatriate sportspeople in Germany
Expatriate footballers in Germany